USS Hiawatha has been the name of more than one United States Navy ship, and may refer to:

 , a patrol vessel in commission from 1917 to 1920
 , a tug in commission in 1918
 , later YTB-265 and YTM-265, a tug placed in service in 1942 and sold for scrapping in 1987

United States Navy ship names